The Women's time trial of the 2014 UCI Road World Championships took place in and around Ponferrada, Spain on 23 September 2014. Ellen van Dijk was the defending champion, after winning her first world time trial title in 2013.

Germany's Lisa Brennauer won the world title, becoming the third German rider to do so after Judith Arndt and Hanka Kupfernagel. Brennauer was victorious by 18.68 seconds over the Ukraine's Hanna Solovey, with Evelyn Stevens a further 2.57 seconds behind in the bronze medal position for the United States. Van Dijk, the defending champion, could do no better than seventh place in the final standings, over a minute in arrears of Brennauer.

Qualification

All National Federations were allowed to enter four riders for the race, with a maximum of two riders to start. In addition to this number, the outgoing World Champion and the current continental champions were also able to take part.

Course
The time trial started in the centre of Ponferrada and passed through La Martina, Posada del Bierzo and Carracedelo before returning to Ponferrada. A short stretch before riding into Ponferrada was made for the championships.

Schedule
All times are in Central European Time (UTC+1).

Participating nations
47 cyclists (from a start list of 49 riders) from 30 nations took part in the women's time trial. The number of cyclists per nation is shown in parentheses.

  Australia (1)
  Austria (2)
  Belgium (1)
  Brazil (1)
  Canada (2)
  Colombia (1)
  Croatia (1)
  Czech Republic (1)
  Denmark (1)
  Estonia (1)
  Finland (2)
  France (2)
  Germany (3)
  Greece (1)
  Italy (2)
  Japan (2)
  Latvia (2)
  Lithuania (2)
  Luxembourg (1)
  Mexico (2)
  Netherlands (2)
  New Zealand (1)
  Poland (2)
  Portugal (1)
  Russia (2)
  South Africa (1)
  Spain (2) (host)
  Switzerland (1)
  Ukraine (2)
  United States (2)

Prize money
The UCI assigned premiums for the top 3 finishers, with a total prize money of €7,766.

Final classification

References

Women's time trial
UCI Road World Championships – Women's time trial
2014 in women's road cycling